Ruston High School is a four-year public high school located in the Lincoln Parish School District of Ruston, Louisiana, United States. The school has an enrollment of approximately 1300 students with 85 faculty members; the mascot is the Bearcats named "Rusty,” by a class of 2009 student, Anna Ward. The school colors are red and white. Black students were first admitted in 1970. Ruston High School also serves as a memorial to the survivors of the Gulf War.

The  campus area, comprising two contributing buildings, was added to the National Register of Historic Places on October 8, 1992.

New Tech @ Ruston 
New Tech @ Ruston began with the Founding Fathers Cathi Cox-Boniol and Missy Wooley in 2011 with a large grant from the state, along with grants to start construction two new technology graded buildings on the Ruston High Campus.  The New Tech building opened by July 2, 2013, on which date the Lincoln Parish School Board toured the facility and held its monthly meeting in the building for the first time.

Athletics
Ruston High athletics competes in the LHSAA.

Championships
Football championships
(1) National Championship: 1990 
(8) State Championships: 1925, 1941, 1947, 1951, 1982, 1986, 1988, 1990
(4) State Runner-up: 1944, 1984, 1998, 2022 

Coaches
 Jimmy Childress - LHSAA Hall of Fame Head Coach, Jimmy Childress (1932-2015), was head coach at Ruston High School for twelve seasons from 1979 to 1991. He led his alma mater to a 131–27 (.829) record and four state championships in 1982, 1986, 1988, and 1990. His 1990 team also won a national championship. As a player, he was on the 1947 state championship football team. He was an assistant football coach at Neville High School in Monroe from 1958 to 1972 helping the school to win four state championships and was later head coach at Carroll High School in Monroe in 1973 and at the private Cedar Creek School in Ruston from 1976 to 1978. He also coached at the college level at Northeastern Louisiana University from 1974 to 1976. In 2001, he was inducted into the Louisiana Sports Hall of Fame.

Childress played football and received his undergraduate degree at the University of Louisiana at Monroe, then known as Northeast Louisiana State College, and obtained his graduate degree at Louisiana Tech University.

Notable alumni 

Leon Barmore -- Louisiana Tech Lady Techsters basketball coach 1977–2002.
Kentrell Brice (class of 2013) -- NFL player
Wayne Cage, Former MLB player (Cleveland Indians)
Fred Dean—inductee into the NFL Pro Football Hall of Fame, played for Louisiana Tech, San Diego Chargers, and San Francisco 49ers
Andy Hamilton, NFL player
Bert Jones -- NFL Quarterback, nicknamed "The Ruston Rifle", played for LSU earning Heisman Trophy contention and All-America honors for his 1972 season and inducted into the College Football Hall of Fame in 2016. He was the 1973 NFL 2nd overall draft pick by the Baltimore Colts and later played for the Los Angeles Rams
Rob Shadoin (Class of 1971) -- member of the Louisiana House of Representatives for District 10 in Lincoln and Union parishes since 2012
Michael Brooks (Class of 1982) (born October 2, 1964, in Ruston, Louisiana) is a former American football linebacker in the National Football League. He played for Ruston High School, college ball at Louisiana State University (LSU), then professionally with the Denver Broncos, the New York Giants, and the Detroit Lions.
Kyle Williams (Class of 2002) (born June 10, 1983, in Ruston, Louisiana) is a retired American football defensive tackle of the Buffalo Bills in the National Football League. He was drafted in the fifth-round of the 2006 NFL Draft and played his entire 13-year career with the Bills. He is currently the Defensive Coordinator for the Bearcats.
Jack Ramsaur II (attended in the 1970s) Maj. Gen. Jack W. Ramsaur II is the mobilization assistant to the Commander, Headquarters Air Education and Training Command, Randolph Air Force Base, Texas.
Jeff Mangum (Class of 1989) Born October 24, 1970. Musician best known for being the lyricist, vocalist and guitarist of the band Neutral Milk Hotel, as well as being one of the cofounders of The Elephant 6 Recording Company.
Robert Schneider (Class of 1989) Born March 9, 1971. Musician and record producer best known as the leader of pop band The Apples in stereo, as well as being one of the cofounders of The Elephant 6 Recording Company.
George Stone, Former MLB player (Atlanta Braves, New York Mets)
Will Cullen Hart (Class of 1990) Born May 29, 1971. Musician best known as a leader of psychedelic-pop band The Olivia Tremor Control, as well as being one of the cofounders of The Elephant 6 Recording Company.
Rodney Young (Class of 1991), Played college football at LSU, played 4 year of NFL football (New York Giants).
Mike Green (Class of 1996), (born December 6, 1976, in Ruston, Louisiana) is a retired American football safety and cornerback for the NFL. He played football at Ruston High School and Northwestern State. He was drafted by the Chicago Bears as the last player drafted in the 2000 NFL Draft making him that year's "Mr. Irrelevant". He later played for the Seattle Seahawks and the Washington Redskins.
Isaiah Buggs (Class of 2015) Ranked by Rivals as 2017 #1 Juco player in the nation. Starting Defensive End at the University of Alabama and a 2018 College Football Playoff National Champion. He is currently an American football defensive tackle for the Detroit Lions in the National Football League. He was drafted in the sixth-round of the 2019 NFL Draft by the Pittsburgh Steelers.
Scotty Thurman (Class of 2013) an American former professional basketball player and current assistant coach.
Kenny Wright  played football at Ruston High School, Northwestern State University, University of Arkansas, and was drafted by the Minnesota Vikings in 1999. He is currently the Defensive Backs Coach for the Bearcats.

See also
 National Register of Historic Places listings in Lincoln Parish, Louisiana

References

 "History of Ruston High School. Arkansasnewslist2007/halloffame02

External links 

 Official website
 School History from the Alumni Association

Ruston, Louisiana
Public high schools in Louisiana
Schools in Lincoln Parish, Louisiana
School buildings on the National Register of Historic Places in Louisiana
National Register of Historic Places in Lincoln Parish, Louisiana
Educational institutions established in 1921
1921 establishments in Louisiana